Plessner or Plesner is a German surname. Notable people with the surname include:

 Clementine Plessner, née Folkmann (1855-1943), Jewish Austrian actress
 Helmuth (Karl Otto Gustav Bernhard) Plessner (1892-1985), German philosopher and sociologist of Jewish descent
 Abraham Plessner (1900-1961), Jewish Polish-Russian mathematician

Plesner 

 Yohanan Plesner (born 1972), Israeli politician
 The Plesner Fragment, a parchment page from c. 1275

Pleß 
 Helmut Pleß (2 November 1918 – 25 December 1999) was a highly decorated Leutnant in the Luftwaffe during World War II, and a recipient of the Knight's Cross of the Iron Cross.
 A mountain in Germany.

Platz 
Old German form of the surname Pless.

References 

German-language surnames
Toponymic surnames
People from Pszczyna